LinkedIn Learning is an American online learning provider. It provides video courses taught by industry experts in software, creative, and business skills. It is a subsidiary of LinkedIn. All the courses on LinkedIn fall into four categories: Business, Creative, Technology and Certifications.

It was founded in 1995 by Lynda Weinman as Lynda.com before being acquired by LinkedIn in 2015. Microsoft acquired LinkedIn in December 2016.

History
LinkedIn Learning was founded as Lynda.com in 1995 in Ojai, California, as online support for the books and classes of Lynda Weinman, a special effects animator and multimedia professor who founded a digital arts school with her husband, artist Bruce Heavin.

In 2002, the company began offering courses online. By 2004, there were 100 courses, and in 2008, the company began producing and publishing documentaries on creative leaders, artists, and entrepreneurs.

In 2013, Lynda.com received its first outside investment, raising $103 million in growth equity from Accel Partners and Spectrum Equity, with additional contributions from Meritech Capital Partners. On January 14, 2015, Lynda.com announced it had raised $186 million in financing, led by investment group TPG Capital.

On April 9, 2015, LinkedIn announced its intention to buy Lynda.com in a deal valued at $1.5 billion, which officially closed on May 14, 2015.

In 2016, Lynda.com began to broadcast courses on their Apple TV application.

On June 13, 2016, Microsoft announced that it would acquire Lynda.com's parent company LinkedIn for $26.2 billion. The acquisition was completed on December 8, 2016.

In October 2017, Lynda.com was merged and renamed LinkedIn Learning. In 2019, the site announced that users accessing LinkedIn Learning through their public library would be required to create a LinkedIn profile in order to use the service; the decision faced criticism from librarians and the American Library Association. As of March 2021, libraries started migrating to LinkedIn Learning without requiring patrons to create a LinkedIn profile. 

On June 2, 2021, the lynda.com site was shutdown and is now permanently redirected to LinkedIn Learning.

Acquisitions 

In February 2013, Lynda.com acquired video2brain, an Austrian-based provider of online classes in web design and programming, available in German, French, Spanish, and English.

On April 7, 2014, Lynda.com purchased Canadian startup Compilr, provider of an online editor and sandbox.

Service details 
LinkedIn Learning is a subscription service that costs $40/month or $25/month if paid annually (as of 2021). It has a catalog of 16,000+ courses and learning paths.

References

External links 
 

LinkedIn
American educational websites
Educational technology companies of the United States
Education companies established in 1995
Internet properties established in 1995
Virtual learning environments
1995 establishments in California
2015 mergers and acquisitions